This article provides details of international football games played by the Israel national football team from 1990 to 2019.

1990

1992

1993

1994

1995

1996

1997

1998

1999

2000

2001

2002

2003

2004

2005

2006

2007

2008

2009

2010

2011

2012

2013

2014

2015

2016

2017

2018

2019

See also
Israel national football team results (2020–present)
Israel national football team results (1960–1989)
Israel national football team results (1934–1959)

Football in Israel
1990
1990s in Israeli sport
2000s in Israeli sport
2010s in Israeli sport